The 1944 Philadelphia Eagles season was their 12th in the league. The team improved on their previous output of 5–4–1, winning seven games. The team failed to qualify for the playoffs for the 12th consecutive season.

Rookie Mel Bleeker broke was the NFL’s top receiver, as he played 9 games for the Eagles, starting three of them. He was second in the NFL in long reception (75), third in touchdowns (8; still the team's all-time rookie record) and yards/rushing attempt (5.3), fourth in yards from scrimmage (614), and sixth in points scored (48). He led the Eagles in touchdowns and scoring, despite having been primarily a blocking back in college.

Off Season

NFL Draft 
The 1944 NFL Draft was held on April 19, 1944. The draft would be for 32 rounds. Again in round 2 and 4 only the 5 lowest wins teams from the 1943 season would pick. The Eagles would alternate with the Pittsburgh Steelers in picking either 4th or 9th in each round.

Player selections 
The table shows the Eagles selections and what picks they had that were traded away and the team that ended up with that pick. It is possible the Eagles' pick ended up with this team via another team that the Eagles made a trade with.
Not shown are acquired picks that the Eagles traded away.

Schedule

Standings

Roster 
(All time List of Philadelphia Eagles players in franchise history)

 Link to all time List of Philadelphia Eagles players in franchise history

References 

Philadelphia Eagles seasons
Philadelphia Eagles
Philadelphia